African cheetah refers to any of the following cheetah (Acinonyx jubatus) subspecies native to Africa:
 Southeast African cheetah (Acinonyx jubatus jubatus)
 Northeast African cheetah (Acinonyx jubatus soemmeringii)
 Northwest African cheetah (Acinonyx jubatus hecki)

Acinonyx
Cheetah
Mammals of Africa